Lespinasse was a fine dining establishment initially run by and primarily associated with executive chef Gray Kunz (1955–2020). It was located in the St. Regis New York hotel in Midtown Manhattan, New York City.  It was celebrated for its house culinary style termed "cuisine spontanée", a variant of nouvelle cuisine first developed by Paul Bocuse and Roger Vergé, and noted for the amount of future star chefs who worked under the aegis of Kunz in its kitchen, including; Andrew Carmellini, Floyd Cardoz, Rocco DiSpirito, and Corey Lee.

Kunz, a Singapore-born Swiss, directed the eatery and served up French-Asian cuisine there until 1998. The French chef Christian Delouvrier then took over culinary control of the establishment and ran its kitchen until the restaurant closed in April 2003.

References

Defunct restaurants in New York City
Restaurants disestablished in 2003
2003 disestablishments in New York (state)